USCGC Cobb (WPG-181) was a United States Coast Guard cutter commissioned during World War II. A conversion of the 1906 coastal steamboat , USCGC Cobb in the hands of the Coast Guard became the first US helicopter carrier.

Background

The U.S. government became interested in the potential of the helicopter during the 1930s. In 1938, the government allocated two million dollars toward development of the machine, and an inter-agency board—which included a representative from the U.S. Coast Guard, Commander William J. Kossler—was established to oversee the program. Kossler had difficulty persuading the U.S. Navy of the utility of the helicopter and eventually enlisted the aid of Executive Officer Lieutenant Commander Frank Erickson of Coast Guard Air Station Brooklyn.

Erickson, who had helplessly watched sailors burn to death in oil slicks with no hope of rescue during the Japanese attack on Pearl Harbor, immediately saw the utility of the helicopter in a search-and-rescue role. However, as the Navy showed little interest at this time in development of improved search-and-rescue methods, Erickson promoted the helicopter's usefulness as an anti-submarine warfare (ASW) weapon instead. This proposal met with the approval of the Navy, and on 19 February 1943, the Coast Guard was formally assigned the task of developing the helicopter for the ASW role.

Acquisition and refit

As part of its ASW program, the Coast Guard began experimenting with ship-based helicopter operations. Initially, a series of flights was conducted from the deck of a ship at anchor, Bunker Hill. When these trials proved successful, the Coast Guard moved to open sea trials.

For the sea trials, the Coast Guard acquired an ageing passenger steamer, from the War Shipping Administration. The Coast Guard carried out major modifications to the ship, including removal of much of the ship's superstructure for the installation of a 38 × 63 foot flight deck for the use of helicopters, plus the addition of armor and weaponry. Following these modifications, the ship was commissioned on 20 July 1943 as USCGC Cobb (WPG-181)—the first US helicopter carrier.

Service history

In January 1944, the ship was ordered to Groton, Connecticut for sound and radar training. In April, the ship was assigned to New York City to train for helicopter landings on board its flight deck. The first such landing occurred on 15 June. On 29 July 1944, the first take-off took place in Long Island Sound  from Cobb flight deck.

With the threat from submarines greatly diminished by early 1945, the Coast Guard turned its attention to development of the helicopter in the search-and-rescue role. USCGC Cobb also played a role in this program when helicopters from its flight deck performed some of the earliest air-sea rescues.

In spite of her historic achievements, USCGC Cobb proved an unsatisfactory acquisition. Originally America's first turbine-powered steamship, the aging 37-year-old vessel proved a liability to the Coast Guard with her excessive maintenance costs. During the first 115 days of the ship's service, Cobb was absent from the repair yard for a total of only nine days. Thereafter she managed operational duties an average of only one week out of four.

USCGC Cobb was decommissioned by the Coast Guard on 31 January 1946. She was sold on 6 March 1947, and scrapped a short time later.

Footnotes

References
 Conwell, First Lieutenant Andrew, USAF (2008): "History of Coast Guard Rotary-Wing Aviation: From Inception to the Modern Day", United States Coast Guard website.
 Cobb, 1944 WPG-181 (ex-Governor Cobb), United States Coast Guard website.

Ships built by the Delaware River Iron Ship Building and Engine Works
Ships of the United States Coast Guard
1906 ships